Tai Wai Nullah, sometimes referred to as the upper stream of Shing Mun River, is one of the nullahs of Shing Mun River in Tai Wai of Hong Kong.

The channelised nullah has a width of about 39 m. As water flow is very low most of the time, the concrete nullah bed is exposed.

See also
List of rivers and nullahs in Hong Kong

References

Further reading

 Chuk, Lin-ping, "Reconnecting over nullah : community foci at Tai Wai", Postgraduate Thesis, Master of Architecture, University of Hong Kong, 1998
  

Sha Tin District
Tai Wai
Rivers of Hong Kong